Matthew Joseph Real (born July 10, 1999) is an American professional soccer player who plays as left-back for the Philadelphia Union of Major League Soccer.

Club career

Bethlehem Steel FC
Real signed an amateur deal to play with United Soccer League side Bethlehem Steel FC for their 2016 season. He had committed to play college soccer at Wake Forest University, before opting to sign a professional contract with Bethlehem Steel FC on January 17, 2017.

Philadelphia Union
Real signed a homegrown contract with Bethlehem Steel's MLS parent club Philadelphia Union on January 18, 2018. Real made his MLS debut in the Union's 3–0 loss to the Colorado Rapids on March 31, 2018. Putting forth a solid 75-minute performance, saving a goal on the line to keep the Rapids scoreless heading into the half. In September 2020, Real scored his first goal for the Union as a substitute in a 3–0 victory over New York Red Bulls.

Career statistics

Honors
Philadelphia Union
 Supporters' Shield: 2020

United States U20
 CONCACAF U-20 Championship: 2018

Personal life
Real was born in the United States to a Brazilian father and an American mother Who’s name is christen real

References

External links 
 
 
 Bethlehem Steel FC player profile

1999 births
Living people
American soccer players
American sportspeople of Brazilian descent
American people of Italian descent
Association football defenders
Philadelphia Union II players
Major League Soccer players
Philadelphia Union players
Soccer players from Pennsylvania
Sportspeople from Delaware County, Pennsylvania
USL Championship players
People from Drexel Hill, Pennsylvania
United States men's under-20 international soccer players
Homegrown Players (MLS)
MLS Next Pro players